The 1982–83 Washington Huskies men's basketball team represented the University of Washington for the 1982–83 NCAA Division I men's basketball season. Led by twelfth-year head coach Marv Harshman, the Huskies were members of the Pacific-10 Conference and played their home games on campus at Hec Edmundson Pavilion in Seattle, Washington.

 There was no conference tournament yet; it debuted four years later.

References

External links
Sports Reference – Washington Huskies: 1982–83 basketball season

Washington Huskies men's basketball seasons
Washington Huskies
Washington
Washington